Wildcat Saunders is a 1936 American Western film written and directed by Harry L. Fraser. The film stars Jack Perrin, Blanche Mehaffey, William Gould, Fred Toones, Roger Williams, Tom London and Ed Cassidy. The film was released on March 4, 1936, by Atlantic Pictures Corporation.

Plot

Cast           
Jack Perrin as Wildcat Saunders
Blanche Mehaffey as June Lawson
William Gould as Joe Pipp 
Fred Toones as Snowflake
Roger Williams as Laramie
Tom London as Pete Hawkins
Ed Cassidy as Dad Lawson

References

External links
 

1936 films
1930s English-language films
American Western (genre) films
1936 Western (genre) films
Films directed by Harry L. Fraser
American black-and-white films
1930s American films